There have been two baronetcies created for people with the surname Lyons. Both recipients were later elevated to the peerage.

Lyons baronets, of Christchurch (1840)
see the Viscount Lyons

Lyons baronets, of Grateley (1937)
see the Baron Ennisdale

Lyons